The Storm Within may refer to:
 The working title for the soap opera The Secret Storm
 The Storm Within, originally titled Les Parents terribles, an adaptation of the play
 The Storm Within (2013 film), originally titled Rouge sang, a 2013 Canadian film
 The Storm Within (album), an album by Evergrey